N. M. Appuhamy was a Ceylonese businessman. He was an elected member of the Senate of Ceylon from the United National Party.

References

Members of the Senate of Ceylon
Sri Lankan businesspeople
United National Party politicians
Sinhalese politicians